Carl d'Silva (died 19 July 2015) was an Indian wildlife artist and naturalist well known for his paintings of birds in many ornithological handbooks and field guides.

Born in Goa, D'Silva worked with Salim Ali and illustrated several of his books published by the Bombay Natural History Society. When Salim Ali's Book of Indian Birds was revamped for his birth centenary in 2002 (13th ed.), Carl re-did all the drawings.  He has also illustrated a number of bird field guides produced by Christopher Helm.

References

Bird artists
20th-century Indian painters
Indian illustrators
Painters from Goa
Members of the Bombay Natural History Society